The 1912 Tour de France was the tenth running of the Tour de France. The Tour took place from 30 June to 28 July. After 4 stage wins during the Tour of Belgium, the Alcyon team hired Odile Defraye to help Gustave Garrigou repeat his win of the 1911 Tour de France. However, as the race progressed, it was clear that Defraye was the stronger rider, and he was made team leader. Defraye won the 1912 Tour de France, while Garrigou came in third place.

Innovations and changes
The point system from the 1911 Tour de France was still in use, including the cleaning up of the classification after stages 8 and 14.
It was changed in one aspect: if one or more cyclists, excluding the first seven, finished in the same time, they split their points. In stage 8, the first thirteen cyclists finished at the same time. The first seven to cross the line got the normal number of points, but the eighth to thirteenth cyclists all got 10.5 points.

Technically, the bicycles were similar to the 1911 bicycles, only Stéphanois Panel experimented with a derailleur system. This was quickly forbidden afterwards by Tour organiser Henri Desgrange, and only allowed again in 1937.

Teams

The 1912 Tour started with 131 cyclists; there were 10 teams of 5 cyclists each; these 50 cyclists included all favourites for the overall victory. The remaining 81 cyclists started in the isolés category. The Alcyon team had the pre-race favourite, Gustave Garrigou, the winner of the previous Tour de France. To help him, they hired Odile Defraye, who had performed well at the 1912 Tour of Belgium. At first, the Alcyon team did not want to select Defraye, but the Belgian representative of Alcyon posed commercial threats, and Defraye was selected.

Race overview

In the first stage, the favourites remained calm. This first stage was won by Charles Crupelandt. Defraye finished 14th, while Garrigou finished in 21st place. In the second stage, Defraye and Garrigou were ahead of the rest, and Defraye won the stage. At that point, Defraye was second in the general classification, only one point behind Vincenzo Borgarello, the first Italian leader of the general classification ever. When Garrigou punctured because of nails spread by vandals, Defraye waited for him. During the long chase for the rest, it was clear that Defraye was stronger than Garrigou, who encouraged Defraye to continue alone. Defraye became a favourite for the overall victory, and his teammates gave him their support. He was the first Belgian who had a serious chance to win the Tour de France, so all Belgians in the race, regardless of their team, were helping him.

One remaining competitor was Octave Lapize. In the fifth stage, Defraye had problems with his knees, and was more than fifteen minutes behind Lapize. Defraye came back, and kept Lapize one point behind him in the general classification. In the sixth stage, Defraye attacked and only Lapize could follow, as they climbed the major Alp mountains together. Then Defraye punctured, and Lapize won the stage, so Lapize shared the lead with Defraye. In the seventh stage, Defraye punctured again, but he came back and won the stage. The eighth stage was a flat stage, and the fight was expected to continue in the ninth stage. Before the ninth stage, Lapize was only 2 points behind. During that stage in the Pyrenees, Defraye broke away on the Col de Portet d'Aspet, and Lapize could not follow. Later, Lapize stopped in protest because all the Belgians were riding for Defraye. Lapize said: "How can you expect me to challenge in such conditions?" The rest of his team La Française, the two remaining Charles Crupelandt and Marcel Godivier did not start the next stage, also in protest.

Christophe was not a good sprinter, so he had to break away from Defraye to win back points. With all the Belgians helping Defraye, he could not do this anymore. He could pose no real threat, and Defraye won the overall victory unchallenged. If the Tour de France was decided on time instead of points, Christophe would have led the race until the final stage, where he accepted his loss and allowed a group including Defraye to ride away.

Results

Stage winners

General classification
Of the 131 starting cyclists, 41 finished. The winner received 5000 francs for his victory.

Other classifications
Jules Deloffre, ranked 21 in the general classification, became the winner of the "isolés" category. The "isolés" classification was calculated in the same way as the general classification, but only with the stage results for the cyclists riding as isolated riders. Therefore, it was possible that Deloffre beat Pratesi with 41 points to 42 points in the isolés category, whereas Pratesi ranked higher in the general classification. The organising newspaper l'Auto named Odile Defraye the meilleur grimpeur. This unofficial title is the precursor to the mountains classification.

Notes

References

Bibliography

External links

 
Tour de France
Tour de France by year
Tour de France
Tour de France
Tour de France